Wildwood Enterprises, Inc., is a film and television production company. It was founded by actor and director Robert Redford and producer Bill Holderman.
It is sometimes credited as South Fork Pictures. In 1987, the company had partnered with Cineplex Odeon Films to launch a feature film subsidiary Northfolk Productions, which spent the next five years making five films, all with a budget of between $4 and 5 million.

Sundance Film Festival 
Robert Redford is also founder of the Sundance Film Festival, which takes places annually in January in Utah.

Sundance Productions
Redford is the President and co-Founder of Sundance Productions, with Laura Michalchyshyn.

Most recently, Sundance Productions produced Chicagoland (CNN), Cathedrals of Culture (Berlin Film Festival), The March (PBS) and Emmy Nominee All The President’s Men Revisited (Discovery), Isabella Rossellini’s Green Porno Live!, and To Russia With Love on Epix.

Producer

References

External links 

 
 Bill Holderman on IMDb
 Laura Michalchyshyn on IMDb
 Sundance Productions

Television production companies of the United States
Tourist attractions in Utah
American film studios